Nancy K. Frankenberry (born 1947) is an American philosopher of religion, currently John Phillips Professor Emeritus at Dartmouth College.

References

1947 births
Dartmouth College faculty
Living people
Philosophers of religion
University of California, Berkeley alumni
Women theologians
Presidents of the Metaphysical Society of America
Date of birth missing (living people)